Chrysanthus Notaras (1655/1660 – February 7, 1731), also known as Chrysanthus of Jerusalem, was Greek Orthodox Patriarch of Jerusalem (February 19, 1707 – February 7, 1731) and a scholar in Eastern Orthodoxy.  He was a mathematician, astronomer, geographer, and author.  He is known for creating modern maps in the Greek language.  He was one of  Giovanni Domenico Cassini's students.  He also built astronomical equipment.

Biography

He was born in Arachova, Achaea. He was a member of the same family as his predecessor, Dositheos II Notaras and Macarius of Corinth, Metropolitan of Corinth.  He is known for spreading Astronomy in the early eighteenth century. Chysanthos Notaras was Patriarch of Jerusalem (1707-1731).  He was one of the most educated Greeks of his time.  He was educated in the traditional Orthodox dogma. He learned natural philosophy, mathematics, and theology at the University of Padua.  He continued his education in Paris.  While in Paris he met liberal theologians, such as Louis Ellies Dupin, Noël Alexandre, and Michel Le Quien. He also met astronomer  Giovanni Domenico Cassini.  He became his student.  He studied Astronomy, Geodesy, and Geography (1700).  Cassini was the Director of Paris Observatory.   Chrysanthus served as an observer.  He also built astronomical instruments, under Cassini's supervision.

Notaras's interests in the mathematical sciences continued throughout his life.  His main interests were astronomy and geodesy. He helped create new schools.  He believed scientific teaching was important.  He promoted formal scientific education.  He printed a book called Introduction to Geometry and Spherics. The book did not feature the heliocentric system.  He introduced new methods of accuracy in measurement.  He was aware of the heliocentric system, although he himself wrote about the geocentric Ptolemaic system following Korydalism.  In its opposition to the Copernican system, it does not use theological objections and arguments, but the most substantial objection adopted by scientists during the 16th century.  It exposes objectively and over time other views of ancient and modern astronomers as to which system is most suitable for explaining the motions of the planets. He mentions that the Pythagoreans suggested the movement of the Earth and makes special mention of Aristarchus the Samian.  Chrysanthos Notaras included an astronomy curriculum at the schools of the Holy Sepulchre.

In 1892, the professor of Mathematics G.A. Arvanitakis, in the olive mill of the monastery where the Theological School of the Cross in Jerusalem was housed discovered  a double astrolabe that bore the inscription:

This instrument was made by the monk Chrysanthos under the direction of Cassini for his brothers in Jerusalem, in order to worship God in his works .

Chrysanthos was particularly interested in astronomy and astronomical instruments. He procured several astronomical instruments and telescopes from European cities and even built some of them himself.

Both Greek and Italian education was very strict at the time. Korydalism was the only approved education. Heliocentrism was illegal.  Galileo's books were on the forbidden list by the Index Librorum Prohibitorum.   The Galileo affair and the Greek equivalent, the Methodios Affair were both indications that the church was not ready to accept new ideas.  Notaras took many risks but due to his hi-level in the church, he was able to explore scientific advancement much further than Methodios Anthrakites.  He did not formally publish a book about the heliocentric system. His book featured diagrams following the heliocentric model.  Although the 1758 edition of the Index removed the general prohibition of works advocating heliocentrism, the system did not become accepted in academia until the 19th century.

Literary Works

See also
Theophilos Corydalleus

References

17th-century births
1731 deaths
18th-century Greek Orthodox Patriarchs of Jerusalem
Greek theologians
17th-century Eastern Orthodox theologians
18th-century Eastern Orthodox theologians
People from Achaea
17th-century Greek scientists
17th-century Greek writers
17th-century Greek educators
18th-century Greek scientists
18th-century Greek writers
18th-century Greek educators
17th-century Greek astronomers
18th-century Greek astronomers
18th-century Greek physicists
17th-century Greek physicists